Into the Sun is an album by Randy Brecker, released through Concord Jazz in 1997. In 1998, the album won Brecker the Grammy Award for Best Contemporary Jazz Performance.

Track listing 
All songs by Randy Brecker.

 "Village Dawn" – 6:23
 "Just Between Us" – 5:48
 "The Sleaze Factor" – 4:47
 "Into the Sun" – 6:54
 "After Love" – 7:27
 "Gray Area" – 6:42
 "Tijuca" – 5:18
 "Buds" – 3:55
 "Four Worlds" – 7:18
 "Hottest Man in Town: Prophecy/Growth/Realization/The Horn/Finale" – 4:17

Personnel 

 Randy Brecker – trumpet, arranger, composer, flugelhorn, producer, liner notes
 Maucha Adnet – vocals
 Dave Bargeron – trombone
 Bobby Brecker – composer, performer on "The Hottest Man in Town:  Part I"
 John Burk – executive producer
 Café – percussion
 Greg Calbi – mixing
 Lee Dick – mixing assistant
 Paul DInnocenzo – photography
 Eliane Elias – sequencing
 Lawrence Feldman – bass flute
 Joe Ferla  – engineer, mixing
 Gil Goldstein – accordion, keyboards, producer, orchestration
 Mike Hoaglin – production manager
 Jonathan Joseph – percussion, drums
 Kent Judkins – Art Direction
 Bakithi Kumalo – bass, fretless bass
 Barbara Lipke – mixing assistant
 Mark Mason – mixing assistant
 Bob Mintzer – bass clarinet
 Malcolm Pollack – engineer
 Adam Rogers – acoustic guitar, electric guitar
 David Sanborn – saxophone on "The Sleaze Factor"
 Richard Sussman – synthesizer, programming
 David Taylor – tuba, bass trombone
 Keith Underwood – alto flute, bass flute

References

External links 
 Randy Brecker's official site

1996 albums
Randy Brecker albums
Grammy Award for Best Contemporary Jazz Album